The Confederación Unitaria de Trabajadores (CUT) is a Costa Rican trade union national trade union centre formed in 1980 as a result of the merger of the Federación Nacional de Trabajadores Públicos and the Confederación General de Trabajadores.  The CUT had 54 affiliated unions in 2004.  It is affiliated with the World Federation of Trade Unions.

See also

 Trade unions in Costa Rica

References

Trade unions in Costa Rica
World Federation of Trade Unions
Trade unions established in 1980